The Andrew–Ryan House is a historic house located in Dubuque, Iowa, United States. This is considered the best example of the Second Empire style in the city, and one of finest in the state of Iowa. The two-story brick structure was designed by Dubuque architect Fridolin J. Herr Sr.  It was originally built  to the north, but was moved to its present location between 1885 and 1890. The porches on the south side may have been added at that time. The house is from the high Second Empire style and features a mansard roof, arched windows, dominant chimneys, a prominent belvedere, and classical moldings on the pilasters, belt courses, and stone work.

The house was individually listed on the National Register of Historic Places in 1985. It was included as a contributing property in the Jackson Park Historic District in 1986.

References

Houses completed in 1873
Second Empire architecture in Iowa
Houses in Dubuque, Iowa
National Register of Historic Places in Dubuque, Iowa
Houses on the National Register of Historic Places in Iowa
Individually listed contributing properties to historic districts on the National Register in Iowa